Foliata, a Latin word meaning leafy, may refer to:
 Papilla foliata, the Latin name for a type of taste bud on the tongue

species Latin names

 Dipoena foliata, Keyserling, 1886, a spider species in the genus Dipoena and the family Theridiidae found in Brazil
 Galeola foliata (F.Muell.) F.Muell., an orchid species in the genus Galeola : see also List of Australian plant species authored by Ferdinand von Mueller
 Libellula foliata (Kirby, 1889), a dragonfly species in the genus Libellula found in Mexico

See also
 Foliatum (disambiguation)
 Foliatus (disambiguation)
 Defoliata
 Boronia defoliata, F.Muell., an Australian plant species authored by Ferdinand von Mueller in the genus Boronia
 Peperomia defoliata, a species in the genus Peperomia
 Efoliata
 Indigofera efoliata, F.Muell., an Australian plant species authored by Ferdinand von Mueller in the genus Indigofera
 Tetratheca efoliata, F.Muell., an Australian plant species authored by Ferdinand von Mueller in the genus Tetratheca
 Trifoliata
 Indigofera trifoliata, a species in the genus Indigofera